The 1969 TVW Channel 7 Le Mans 6 Hour Race was an endurance race for Open and Closed Sports Cars, Improved Production Touring Cars and Series Production Touring Cars. The event was staged on 2 June 1969 at the Wanneroo Park circuit in Western Australia. It was the 14th Le Mans 6 Hour Race to be held in Western Australia and the first to be held at Wanneroo Park.

Results

Note: Cars which were still running at the end of the six hours but covered less than 184 laps (two thirds winner’s distance) were not classified as finishers.

References

 Six Hours Le Mans
TVW Channel 7 Le Mans 6 Hour Race
June 1969 sports events in Australia